The Kingston Trio: The Guard Years is a compilation of The Kingston Trio's recordings when Dave Guard was a member of the Trio along with Bob Shane and Nick Reynolds.

The Guard Years is a 10-CD box set and was released in 1997. It contains 240 songs, 17 of them are previously unissued live tracks from 1958-59. The set included a 108-page hardcover book containing photos and stories of the group, recording sessions, and notes on the songs. All the albums were originally  released on Capitol Records from 1958 to 1961, the year Guard left the group and formed the Whiskeyhill Singers with former Trio bassist David "Buck" Wheat.

Reception

Allmusic critic Bruce Eder feels that while a daunting collection of 240 songs, the box set best shows the development of the Trio. "The fact that nine of these ten discs contain material intended for release over a period of just four years is an indicator of the demand for their music — the Kingston Trio was the first popular act whose albums outsold their singles, and the result was 200 songs cut in just four years. That may be more Kingston Trio than most fans feel they need, but not more than can stand the test of listening... Showing off the range of their repertory, they draw on influences from blues to Broadway, with detours into the work of Ray Charles and Uncle Dave Macon, as well as Woody Guthrie and Lee Hays... The box is daunting in its scope, as is the book, whose separate song histories are a welcome addition to the usual sessionography."

Personnel
Dave Guard – vocals, banjo, guitar, bouzouki
Bob Shane – vocals, guitar, banjo
Nick Reynolds – vocals, tenor guitar, bongos, conga
David "Buck" Wheat – bass, guitar
Buzz Wheeler – bass
Mongo Santamaria – percussion, conga
Jack Sperling – drums
Les Bennetts – guitar
J.D. Crowe – bajo sexto
Lonnie Donegan – guitar, vocals
Eddie Duran – guitar
William Correa – timbales
G. B. Grayson – fiddle, vocals
Merle Kilgore – vocals
Henry Whitter – guitar, vocals

Production notes
Voyle Gilmore – producer
Paul Surratt – reissue producer, photography, illustrations
Richard Weize – reissue producer, tape research, discography
Charles K. Wolfe – liner notes
Bob Jones – mastering, transfers
Jurgen Crasser – mastering
Jay Ranellucci – mixing
Ben Blake – song notes
Bill Bush – liner notes, biographical information
Jürgen Feuss – photography, illustrations
Otto Kitsinger – photography, illustrations
R.A. Andreas – photography, illustrations
Brad Benedict – photography, illustrations
Dave Samuelson – liner notes, discography
Sylke Holtrop – artwork, illustrations
Wolfgang Taubenauer – artwork
Phil Wells – tape comparison, discography

References

External links
 The Kingston Trio Liner Notes

Guard Years
Albums produced by Voyle Gilmore
1997 compilation albums
Bear Family Records compilation albums